Ljunghusen Golf Club is a links golf club located in Höllviken, Skåne County in Sweden. It has hosted the PLM Open on the European Tour.

History
The club is located on Sweden's southern tip, along the Baltic Sea. Its first six holes were built in 1932 and by 1965 the club was the first in Scandinavia to feature 27 holes. It is one of few links courses in Sweden and is repeatedly ranked one of the best courses in the country.

The club has hosted the PLM Open on the European Tour as well as the Telia Grand Prix on the Challenge Tour.  

It has also hosted many amateur tournaments such as the 1977 Vagliano Trophy and the European Amateur Team Championship in 2001 and 2019.

Tournaments hosted

European Tour
PLM Open – 1987

Challenge Tour Tour
Telia Grand Prix – 19961997199819992000200220032004

Swedish Golf Tour (women)
Tourfinal Vellinge Open – 20152016 
Carpe Diem Beds Trophy – 2018

Amateur
SM Match Play – 1972 
Vagliano Trophy –  1977 
European Amateur Team Championship – 20012019

Course Records
Men: 63 – Luke Donald, 2001 European Amateur Team Championship
Women: 67 – Isabella Deilert, 2018 Carpe Diem Beds Trophy
Source:

Ljunghusen in pictures

See also
List of links golf courses
List of golf courses in Sweden

References

External links

Golf clubs and courses in Sweden